The 1878 Texas gubernatorial election was held to elect the Governor of Texas. Acting Governor R. B. Hubbard did not seek re-election; he was succeeded by Oran Milo Roberts, who defeated William H. Hamman and Anthony Banning Norton.

General election

Candidates
Oran Milo Roberts, Chief Justice of the Texas Supreme Court (Democratic)
William H. Hamman, oil pioneer and former Confederate brigadier general (Greenback)
Anthony Banning Norton, postmaster of Dallas and newspaper publisher (Republican)

Results

References

1866
Texas